Kamptee Coalfield is located in Nagpur district in the Vidarbha region of the Indian state of Maharashtra.

The coalfield
Coalfieds in the Nagpur region are Kamptee, Bokhara and Umrer.

Kamptee Coalfield lies north of Kanhan railway station in Nagpur district. The coalfield extends in north-westerly direction from Kanhan railway station towards Saoner.

Exploration
While presently (2012) only one mine is being worked in Kamptee Coalfield, detailed exploration has revealed large deposits of coal in three blocks: Ghatrohan area to the east of the Kanhan river, Silewara area to the west of the Kanhan river, Bina area to the south of the Kanhan river. Non-coking coal is available in five workable seams. The moisture content of the coals varies from 8 to 11% and the volatile matter from 33 to 43%.

Reserves
According to the Geological Survey of India, Kamptee Coalfield has total reserves of 2,296.84 million tonnes of non-coking coal, up to a depth of 1,200 m, out of which 1,233.74 million tonnes are proved reserves and the rest being indicated or inferred. Bulk of the coal is up to a depth of 300 m.

References

Coalfields of India
Energy in Maharashtra
Nagpur district
Nagpur division
Mining in Maharashtra